The North Holderness Light Railway was a proposed light railway, which was to have been constructed between Beverley and North Frodingham, in the East Riding of Yorkshire, England. It was abandoned in 1903 by the North Eastern Railway (NER) and replaced with a bus service though consideration had been given to build the line to a narrower gauge than standard gauge on account of some of the marshy land that the line would have to cross.

The line would have begun from a junction with the Hull to Scarborough Line, slightly to the north of Beverley railway station, and served villages and agricultural land in the Holderness area. Stations were proposed at Tickton, Routh, Long Riston, Leven, Brandesburton and North Frodingham.

The route can be seen on tiled maps of the North Eastern Railway network still extant at:
 Beverley railway station
 Hartlepool railway station
 Middlesbrough railway station
 Morpeth railway station
 National Railway Museum (York)
 Pickering railway station (Modern reproduction)
 Saltburn railway station
 Scarborough railway station
 Tynemouth Metro station
 Whitby railway station
 York railway station

References

Further reading
 

Railways authorised but not built in the United Kingdom
Rail transport in the East Riding of Yorkshire
Holderness